Talis afra is a moth in the family Crambidae described by George Thomas Bethune-Baker in 1894. It is found in Egypt and Libya.

The wingspan is about 21 mm.

References

Ancylolomiini
Moths described in 1894
Moths of Africa